Galaxy Quest is a comic book sequel to the film Galaxy Quest published by IDW Publishing. The series is entitled Global Warning.

Starting in August 2008, the series is written by Scott Lobdell, with art by Ilias Kyriazis, the story centers on the eve of the re-launch the Galaxy Quest series, now titled Galaxy Quest: The Journey Continues (as featured at the end of the movie), when a world-threatening crisis occurs that requires Jason Nesmith and his fellow actors to save the world once again.

There is also a second series titled "the Journey Continues" which came out January 28, 2015.

Issue #1
Chapter One: Destiny be Mine sees Commander Taggart attempting to defuse an alien bomb to save the Protector from destruction.
Chapter Two: And the Winner is... reveals that the events in Chapter One are part of the two-hour pilot of Galaxy Quest: The Journey Continues. The cast celebrate after a viewing by going to a party, but they learn that their show is scheduled to be broadcast against a potentially highly rated show.
Chapter Three: U.F. Friends or Foes? begins with a giant spaceship dropping into orbit causing a number of natural disasters all over the world, which Laliari identifies as a Judgement Ship that always leaves planets in ruins.

Issue #2
Chapter Four: When Titans Clash
Chapter Five: Reunited
Chapter Six: Tic...Tic...Tic...Tic...

Issue #3
Chapter Seven: My Homeworld Away from Home...
Chapter Eight: The Mists of Delos 57
Chapter Nine: The Last Leg!

Issue #4
Chapter Ten: Be Careful What You Wish For...
Chapter Eleven: Will Act For Food
Chapter Twelve: Alas, Poor Jason!

Issue #5
Chapter Thirteen: Inherit a Cosmic wind...
Chapter Fourteen: My Friend, My Self
Epilogue: Once Moore With Feeling

Notes

Science fiction comics
Comics based on films
2008 comics debuts
Space opera comics